Sunshine & Whiskey is the second studio album by American country music artist Frankie Ballard. It was released on February 11, 2014 via Warner Bros. Records. The album includes Ballard's debut single "Tell Me You Get Lonely" and "Helluva Life," which became Ballard's first number one hit. Unlike its uptempo version on the album, "Don't Tell Mama I Was Drinking" was previously recorded as a ballad under the title "Don't Tell Mama" by three artists: Ty Herndon on his 1996 album Living in a Moment, Gary Allan on his 1999 album Smoke Rings in the Dark, and Doug Stone on his 2007 album My Turn.

Critical reception

Sunshine & Whiskey received generally positive reviews from four music critics. At USA Today, Brian Mansfield rated the album two-and-a-half stars out of four, writing that Ballard's "got an appealing rock delivery, and the songs get more thoughtful as he goes along, right to the tragedy at the end." Gary Graff of The Oakland Press rated the album three out of four stars, stating that it is "evident throughout these 11 songs [are] highly contagious", and they "go down like a well-aged single malt." At AllMusic, Steve Leggett rated the album three-and-a-half out of five stars, saying that "most contemporary country fans should love this album, and there are tracks here where Ballard hits everything right, rising above the commercially generic with energy and intelligence." Matt Bjorke of Roughstock rated the album four stars out of five, stating how Ballard stays true to himself on the album.

Track listing

Personnel
Musicians

 Laura Allen – handclapping, background vocals
 Marshall Altman – handclapping, percussion, background vocals
 Jean Arnellano – handclapping, background vocals
 Frankie Ballard – banjo, handclapping, acoustic guitar, electric guitar, nylon string guitar, lead vocals, background vocals, Wurlitzer
 Cassidy Brown – handclapping, background vocals
 Wendel Burt – handclapping, background vocals
 Colette Busch – handclapping, background vocals
 Perry Coleman – background vocals
 Marlene Cooper – handclapping, background vocals
 Dan Dugmore – pedal steel guitar
 Shannon Forrest – drums
 Tony Harrell – Hammond B-3 organ
 Wes Hightower – background vocals
 Jedd Hughes – electric guitar
 Ken Johnson – background vocals

 Mike Johnson – steel guitar
 Jaren Johnston – beat box
 David LaBruyere – bass guitar
 Luke Laird – beat box
 Troy Lancaster – electric guitar
 Tim Lauer – harmonica, keyboards, organ, piano
 Cassandra Lawson – background vocals
 Tony Lucido – bass guitar
 Jeremy Lutito – bass guitar, drums
 Sonya McDole – handclapping, background vocals
 Rob McNelley – electric guitar
 Geneva Manchester – handclapping, background vocals
 Helen Miles – handclapping, background vocals
 Greg Morrow – drums
 Jason Mowery – acoustic guitar, resonator guitar, mandolin

 Russ Pahl – steel guitar
 Carmen Plumb – handclapping, background vocals
 Alison Prestwood – bass guitar
 Danny Rader – acoustic guitar
 Rich Redmond – percussion
 Anna Riggi – handclapping, background vocals
 Dean Riggi – handclapping, background vocals
 Eddie Robinson – electric guitar, slide guitar
 Amanda Shelton – handclapping, background vocals
 Tawnie Shelton – handclapping, background vocals
 Adam Shoenfeld – electric guitar
 Lisa Torres – background vocals
 Ilya Toshinsky – banjo, resonator guitar
 John Wilson – handclapping, background vocals
 Kim Wilson – handclapping, background vocals

Production

 Marshall Altman – digital editing, overdub engineer, producer, vocal engineer
 LeAnn Bennett – production coordinator
 Drew Bollman – mixing assistant
 Pete Coleman – engineer, mixing
 Paul "Paco" Cossette – assistant engineer
 Brandon Epps – editing engineer
 Shalacy Griffin – production assistant
 Mike "Frog" Griffith – production coordinator
 Scott Hendricks – producer
 Erik "Keller" Jahner – mixing assistant
 Scott Johnson – production assistant
 Jaren Johnston – programming
 Peter King – digital editing
 Michael Knox – producer
 Luke Laird – programming
 Steve Marcantonio – engineer
 Sam Martin – assistant engineer
 Andrew Mendelson – mastering
 Justin Niebank – mixing
 Reid Shippen – engineer, mixing
 Angela Talley – assistant engineer
 Shane Tarleton – creative director
 Chris Tompkins – programming

Chart performance
The album debuted at No. 5 in the Top Country Albums chart, and No. 35 in the Billboard 200, with sales of 11,000 for the week.  As of June 2016, the album has sold 105,000 copies in the US.

Weekly charts

Year-end charts

References

2014 albums
Frankie Ballard albums
Warner Records albums
Albums produced by Marshall Altman
Albums produced by Scott Hendricks